Code page 1009 (CCSID 1009), also known as CP1009 (IBM) and CP20105 (Microsoft), is the International Reference Version (IRV) of ISO 646:1983 until its redefinition in ISO/IEC 646:1991.

Codepage layout

References

1009